The Women's high jump at the 2014 Commonwealth Games, as part of the athletics programme, was a two-day event held at Hampden Park on 30 July and 1 August 2014.

Results

Qualifying round
Qualification: 1.85 (Q) or 12 best performers (q) advance to the Final.

Final

References

Women's high jump
2014
2014 in women's athletics